is a Shinto shrine in Nishinomiya, Hyōgo, Japan. It is the head shrine of the Ebisu sect of Shinto, and it is said that there are about 3,500 shrines under it. Locals call the shrine "Ebessan".

History
It is not clear when this shrine was established. However, it is recorded that it was already on this site, under the name Ebisu-sha, and attracting many worshipers during the Heian period. For many centuries it was known as Nangu-sha, the "Southern Shrine", in reference to its status as a branch shrine of Hirota Shrine, which is located to its north in Nishinomiya. Nishinomiya Shrine itself had a similar relationship with Koshikiiwa Shrine, which was sometimes called Kita no Ebisu, meaning the Northern Ebisu.

Objects of worship
Nishinomiya Shrine has three small inner shrines and each shrine covers one or two kami. The first inner shrine covers Nishinomiya-Ōkami, or Ebisu-no-mikoto, namely Ebisu. The kami of the second shrine are Amaterasu-Ōmikami and Ōkuninushino-Mikoto. The kami of third shrine is Susanoo-no-Mikoto.

It is famous for the Tōka-Ebisu festival, which is held on January 10 every year. Particular to this festival is the "Lucky Men" race. Begun during the Edo period, participants gather in front of the shrine's main gate before 6am on the 10th of January. At 6am, the shrine's drum sounds, the gates are opened, and the assembled crowd sprints perilously 230 meters to the main hall. The top three finishers are given the title of "Lucky Men", and of those three the champion is known as the "Luckiest Man". The race has been known to attract more than 6,000 runners.

Access
Nishinomiya Station of Hanshin Main Line
Nishinomiya Station of JR Kobe Line

References

External links

Nishinomiya Shrine Homepage (in Japanese)
Nishinomiya Shrine's biggest festival "Tokaebisu" Homepage (in Japanese, one of lecturer of Kitakyushu College of Technology wrote)
Thesis of Historical transition of TOKA-EBISU "Open Gate" Ceremony in Nishinomiya Shinto shrine (in English, Hironori Arakawa, Associate Professor of National Institute of Technology, Akashi College wrote)

Shinto shrines in Hyōgo Prefecture
Important Cultural Properties of Japan
Buildings and structures in Japan destroyed during World War II
Beppyo shrines